Golubyata is a rural locality (a selo) in Dobryansky District, Perm Krai, Russia. The population was 153 as of 2010. There are 4 streets.

Geography 
Golubyata is located 54 km east of Dobryanka (the district's administrative centre) by road. Shkaryata is the nearest rural locality.

References 

Rural localities in Dobryansky District